Bocatoreña refers to people or culture from Bocas del Toro Province, Panama. There is a Bocatorian cuisine. Bocas del Toro Day (Dia de Bocas del Toro) marks the anniversary of the province's founding on November 16, 1904. Bands and parades are part of the celebrations. Bastimiento Beach Boys is an eight piece ensemble band of Bocatorian music.

See also
Bokota people
Ngäbe people
Ngöbe–Buglé people

References

Bocas del Toro Province